Hell Run is a  long tributary to Slippery Rock Creek in Lawrence County, Pennsylvania.  Hell Run flows most of its distance through McConnells Mill State Park and is the only stream in Lawrence County, Pennsylvania rated as an Exceptional Value (EV) stream.

Name
The name "Hell's Hollow" and Hell Run has been ascribed to the description of an early settler who stayed the night in the hollow and termed it Hell.

Watershed
The Hell Run watershed is mostly in agricultural use with some strip mines in the upper sections and is natural in the lower sections within McConnell's Mill State Park.  Almost 60% of the watershed is forested.

History
Jacob Shaffer (1809-1810) and Miller Kennedy (1808) were the earliest settlers in the area.  Iron smelting took place in the valley during the late 1800s and an old iron furnace is still present within the watershed.

Designations
The Hell Run watershed has been designated as an Exceptional Value (EV) stream by the PA Fish and Boat Commission.  Hell Run along with Slippery Rock Creek is listed on the Nationwide Inventory of Wild and Scenic Rivers.

See also
 List of rivers of Pennsylvania

References

External links
Hell Run Conservation Plan
Slippery Rock Watershed Coalition

Rivers of Pennsylvania
Tributaries of the Beaver River
Rivers of Lawrence County, Pennsylvania